Loree Rodkin (born February 25, 1949) is an American jewelry designer based in Los Angeles, California. She designed the jewelry worn by Michelle Obama to the inaugural ball in January 2009, now deposited in the permanent collection of the Smithsonian Institution.

Biography
Rodkin was raised in Chicago, Illinois. She moved to Los Angeles where she designed homes for Alice Cooper, Rod Stewart and her then fiance, Bernie Taupin. Her next career was as a talent manager. She managed the careers of Brad Pitt, Robert Downey Jr. and Alexander Godunov, among others.

Designs

Rodkin went on to launch her jewelry brand. Her most famous piece is a bondage ring. These are rings reminiscent of medieval finger armor, which cover the entire finger. Her first sales were to Tommy Perse, then owner of the Maxfield boutique in West Hollywood. Elizabeth Taylor and Barbra Streisand were among her earliest clients.

Her designs were further popularized by First Lady Michelle Obama, who wore Rodkin's  61-carat diamond celestial earrings, a 13-carat diamond cocktail ring and diamond bangles, to the 2009 inaugural balls. The jewelry now hangs in the permanent collection at the National Museum of American History of the Smithsonian Institution.

Rodkin's flagship store is in Tokyo, Japan. Her designs are also sold in retail specialty stores globally. Her clientele has included Elton John, Mary-Kate and Ashley Olsen, Madonna, Daphne Guinness, Mary J. Blige, Cher, Rihanna and Steven Tyler.
Rodkin's collection includes a bath and body product line, eyewear, fragrances and candles.

References

American jewelry designers
Living people
1949 births
Women jewellers